Garlate is a comune (municipality) in the Province of Lecco in the Italian region Lombardy, located about  northeast of Milan and about  south of Lecco.

Garlate borders the municipalities of Galbiate, Lecco, Olginate, Pescate, and Vercurago.

Historical monuments 
 St Stephen Church (Santo Stefano) - building of mediaeval origine, rebuilt in barocco, St. Stepan is celebrated every year as a patron  saint of the city
 Silk Museum (Museo  della setta) - situated in a former silk factory

Demographic evolution

References

External links
 www.comune.garlate.lc.it/php/index.php

Cities and towns in Lombardy